Turmamidi or Thormamidi is a village in Vikarabad district, in the Indian state of Telangana. It is located in the Bantwaram Mandal of the Vikarabad revenue division and borders the Chincholi Taluk of Karnataka.

Geography
This village has a population of 5,775. Its residents speak Telugu, Urdu and Kannada. Buses connect this village to Zaheerabad, Tandur and Vikarabad. Named after a huge mango tree, that had a gaping hole in its huge trunk, the village that borders Karnataka, has a two-hundred year old temple of Sri Venkateswara, whose idol was unearthed from a farm a kilometre away and consecrated outside the village. The deity, being carted by village leaders, refused to enter the village gate, still existing in a partial form. The annual festival is held on Chaitra Pournima (full Moon Day) corresponding to about April.
Nearby is Ambrameneswar, five km away nestled in a hillock, where the annual fair is held on last Monday of Sravan. A sugar factory set up in late 60s still survives.

How to reach

Buses From Tandur to Turmamidi:6.20 16.20

Turmamidi to Tandur via Bantwaram 11.00 11.45

Vikarabad to Turmamidi: 715 1330 1900 (via Bantwaram)
Vikarabad to Bantwaram :630 1630 (via Rompally)

Buses from Zahirabad to Turmaamidi: 8.50 13.30  16.30  20.30 

Buses from Zahirabad to Maniarpally near Thormamidi: 630 830 1030 1430 1630 1830 2100

Tourist attractions
 Ethipothala Falls
 Chandrampalli Dam

References 

Villages in Vikarabad district